Simon James Power  (born 5 December 1969) is a former New Zealand National Party politician and who served as a Cabinet Minister for the first parliamentary term of the Fifth National Government of New Zealand and as Member of Parliament for Rangitīkei.   Power held the roles of Minister of Justice, Minister for State Owned Enterprises, Minister of Commerce and Consumer Affairs and Deputy Leader of the House.

He was appointed CEO of TVNZ in 2021, having previously served as Acting CEO of Westpac  New Zealand. He also serves as the chairman of the King's College Board of Governors.

Early years

Power was educated in Palmerston North, attending St Peter's College. He was prominent in the life of St Peter's, captaining two senior sports teams and chairing the School Council. He later studied at Victoria University of Wellington, gaining first a Bachelor of Arts degree in political science and then a Bachelor of Laws degree. For two years, he was president of the Victoria University Law Students' Society. He completed his university study in 1993.

After leaving university, Power worked as a lawyer in Palmerston North. For a brief period, he also worked in Auckland. In 1998, he decided to enter national politics. Having been a member of the National Party since the year he left university, he secured the party's nomination for Rangitikei, a predominantly rural area just outside Palmerston North. The incumbent, National MP Denis Marshall, retired from Parliament in 1999.

Member of Parliament

In the 1999 election, Power won Rangitikei. He defeated his opponent, the Labour Party's Craig Walsham, by slightly under three hundred votes. Once in parliament, Power became his party's spokesman on Labour, Industrial Relations, and Youth Affairs. After he retained his seat in the 2002 election, these roles were swapped for Justice, Tertiary Education, and Workplace Skills. In 2003, when Don Brash became leader of the National Party, Power's responsibilities were once again reshuffled, giving him the portfolios of Defence, Veterans' Affairs, and Youth Affairs.

In May 2004, Power caused controversy for his statement that (as regards defence and foreign affairs) "where Britain, the United States and Australia go, we go". Power later expressed regret for how the statement was interpreted, and party leader Don Brash said that it did not reflect National Party policy. In August of the same year, Power was moved from the defence position to that of chief whip.

Between 2005 and 2008, Power was Opposition Spokesperson on Law and Order and repeatedly called for an inquiry into the management of the Corrections Department. A few months before the election in 2008, Parliament's Law & Order Select Committee agreed to hold a wide-ranging inquiry. When National won the election in 2008, Power was appointed Minister of Justice.

Life after Parliament
On 2 March 2011 Power announced he would step down at the end of the term in late 2011. In April 2011, Power's ministerial portfolio for State-Owned Enterprises was transferred to Tony Ryall in preparation for Power's transition into business; he wanted to avoid potential conflicts of interest.

In December 2011 Power was granted the right to retain the title of The Honourable in recognition of his term as a Member of the Executive Council of New Zealand and became The Hon. Simon Power. In January 2012 he became the head of the bank Westpac's Private Bank. In the 2012 Queen's Birthday Honours Power was appointed a Companion of the Queen's Service Order (QSO) for services as a Member of Parliament.

In late December 2021, Power was appointed as the chief executive of the public broadcaster TVNZ. Power had recently stepped down as acting chief of Westpac Bank when the bank appointed Catherine McGrath as chief executive in November 2021. Power is scheduled to assume office in March 2022.

References

External links
Profile at National party
Profile at New Zealand Parliament
Releases and speeches at Beehive.govt.nz
Record in Parliament at TheyWorkForYou.co.nz

|-

1969 births
Living people
20th-century New Zealand lawyers
New Zealand National Party MPs
People from Palmerston North
Victoria University of Wellington alumni
New Zealand bankers
Companions of the Queen's Service Order
Members of the New Zealand House of Representatives
New Zealand MPs for North Island electorates
People educated at St Peter's College, Palmerston North
21st-century New Zealand politicians
Justice ministers of New Zealand